Lorraine Senna (sometimes credited as Lorraine Senna Ferrara) is an American film and television director.

Career 
As a television director, her credits include Dynasty, Emerald Point N.A.S., Trapper John, M.D., Fame, Falcon Crest, Homefront, Dr. Quinn, Medicine Woman, Babylon 5, Northern Exposure, Lois & Clark: The New Adventures of Superman, Picket Fences and The Sopranos. She is the only woman who ever directed any episode of "The Sopranos." From 1978 to 1982, she was an assistant director on a few television films and the series Knots Landing, making her head directorial debut on that series.
 
From 1996 to 2005, she directed a number of television films, beginning with Our Son, the Matchmaker. In 2006, she released her first theatrical film Paradise, Texas. The following year, she released the film Americanizing Shelley, her last credit to date.

References

External links

American television directors
American women film directors
American women television directors
Living people
Place of birth missing (living people)
Year of birth missing (living people)
21st-century American women